Nguyễn Quý Sửu (born 18 October 1986) is a Vietnamese footballer who plays as a defensive midfielder for V.League 2 club Đồng Tháp He has played in 45 games and is now retired from official competition. Nguyễn Quý Sửu played for Hoàng Anh Gia Lai from 2011-2014, FLC Thanh Hóa from 2014-2016 and Long An FC since 2017.

References 

1986 births
Living people
Vietnamese footballers
Association football midfielders
V.League 1 players
Hoang Anh Gia Lai FC players
Thanh Hóa FC players
People from Đồng Tháp Province
Footballers at the 2006 Asian Games
Dong Thap FC players
Asian Games competitors for Vietnam